The 2009–10 Midland Football Combination season was the 73rd in the history of the Midland Football Combination, a football competition in England.

Premier Division

The Premier Division featured 18 clubs which competed in the division last season, along with four new clubs:
Castle Vale JKS, promoted from Division One
Dosthill Colts, promoted from Division One
Pelsall Villa, transferred from the West Midlands (Regional) League
Racing Club Warwick, relegated from the Midland Football Alliance

League table

References

2009–10
10